The Daman and Diu Portuguese Creole,  and by its native speakers as  meaning "home language", refers to variety of Indo-Portuguese creole spoken in the Dadra and Nagar Haveli and Daman and Diu union territory, in the Konkan region of India. Before the Indian annexation of the territory, the creole spoken by the Damanese natives underwent through a profound decreolisation in the erstwhile Portuguese Goa and Damaon colony, a phenomenon whereby the Indo-Portuguese creole reconverged with European Portuguese.

Daman Indo-Portuguese
The Daman creole is a descendant of the Norteiro creole, spoken originally by the Norteiros on the Coast from Chaul, Baçaim, Bombay, Daman and Diu.

The superstrate language is Portuguese. The substrate of the Daman creole is likely to be Konkani. Gujarati has also been suggested as a possible substrate, but this is doubtful since the Gujarati people moved into the region only after the Portuguese arrived.

Diu Indo-Portuguese
The Diu Indo-Portuguese or Diu Portuguese is spoken in Diu district, India.  It is a creole language based mainly on Portuguese and Gujarati. It is a member of the larger family of Indo-Portuguese creoles, particularly close to the variety of Daman. There is a considerably vital oral tradition in this language, with songs regularly performed in Diu, elsewhere in India and among Indo-Portuguese communities abroad.

Widely spoken in the past, it was first documented in the 19th century by the initiative of Hugo Schuchardt. At present, the language is spoken natively by most of the local Catholics, numbering about 180, but is potentially endangered by the pressure of other languages such as Gujarati, English and standard Portuguese.

Number of speakers
The Portuguese heritage in Daman is more common and lively than in Goa and this helped to keep the language alive. The language is spoken by an estimated number of 2,000 Damanese.

See also
Kristi language
Decreolization

References

Daman
 
Diu

Further reading
 APiCS Online - Survey chapter: Diu Indo-Portuguese

Portuguese-based pidgins and creoles
Portuguese dialects
Konkan
Portuguese diaspora in Asia
Daman and Diu
Portuguese language in Asia